The 2014–15 Football League Cup (known as the Capital One Cup for sponsorship reasons) was the 55th season of the Football League Cup. It is a knock-out competition for the top 92 football clubs played in English football league system.

The holders were Manchester City who beat Sunderland 3–1 in the previous season's final at Wembley on 2 March 2014. City were eventually knocked out in the fourth round by Newcastle United.

The first round kicked off on 11 August 2014 and consisted of a North/South split with only regional teams drawn against each other.

The first round included newly promoted Luton Town and Cambridge United from League Two. Premier League teams relegated to the Championship usually receive a bye to the second round, however, this season Cardiff City entered the first round. The remaining Championship, League One and League Two clubs contested the first round, with non-European Premier League sides entering in the second and those involved in European competition entering in the third round.

Chelsea won the trophy after a 2–0 win over London rivals Tottenham Hotspur in the final.

First round
The draw for the first round took place on 17 June 2014 at 10:00 BST. Ties were played during the week commencing 11 August 2014.

The 24 teams of League Two, the 24 teams of League One, and 22 teams from the Championship (70 teams altogether) entered in this round. The two Championship teams exempted from this round were Norwich City and Fulham, the two highest-finishing relegated teams from the 2013–14 Premier League; Cardiff City were also relegated, however they were not given a bye since they finished last. The draw was as follows:

Northern section

Southern section

Numbers within brackets represent a team's league level in the 2014–15 season, level 1 being the Premier League, level 2 the Championship, and so on.

Second round
The 35 winners from Round One were joined by 13 teams from the Premier League (not taking part in European competitions), and the remaining two teams from the Championship (i.e. Norwich and Fulham, the two highest finishing relegated Premier league teams from last season). The remaining 7 Premier League teams participating in the UEFA Champions League or Europa League, received a bye into the third round.

The draw for the second round took place on 13 August 2014. Ties were played during the week commencing 25 August 2014.

Third round
The seven Premier League teams participating in European club competition (UEFA Champions League or Europa League) – holders Manchester City, Arsenal, Chelsea, Everton,  Hull City, Liverpool and Tottenham Hotspur – entered the tournament in this round. They were joined by the 25 winners from Round Two.

The draw for the third round took place on 27 August 2014 live on Sky Sports. Ties were played during the week commencing 22 September 2014.

Fourth round

The draw for the fourth round took place on 24 September 2014. Ties were played during the week commencing 27 October 2014.

Fifth round

The draw for the fifth round took place on 29 October 2014. Ties were played during the week commencing 15 December 2014.

Semi-finals
The draw for the semi-finals took place on 17 December 2014 after the televised game between Bournemouth and Liverpool.

First leg
First-leg matches were played during the week commencing 19 January 2015.

Second leg
Second-leg matches were played during the week commencing 26 January 2015.

Final

The League Cup Final was held on 1 March 2015 at Wembley Stadium.

Broadcasting rights
The live television rights for the competition were held by the subscription channel Sky Sports, who have held rights to the competition since 1996–97. BBC TV had highlights rights, under the title The League Cup Show.

These matches were televised live by Sky Sports:

Match ball
The official match ball for the 2014–15 competition was the Mitre Delta V12S.

References

EFL Cup seasons
Football League Cup
Cup
Football League Cup